Lita Rossana Ford (born 19 September 1958) is an English-born American guitarist, vocalist, and songwriter. She was the lead guitarist for the all-female rock band the Runaways in the late 1970s, and then embarked on a successful glam metal solo career that hit its peak in the late 1980s. The 1989 single "Close My Eyes Forever", a duet with Ozzy Osbourne, remains Ford's most successful song, reaching No. 8 on the US Billboard Hot 100.

Early life
Ford was born to Harry Lenard Ford and Isabella Benvenuto in London, England; her father was British and her mother was Italian. When she was in second grade, she moved with her family to the United States, eventually settling in Long Beach, California.

Inspired by Ritchie Blackmore's work with Deep Purple, she began playing the guitar at the age of 11. Her vocal range is mezzo-soprano.

Music career

The Runaways (1975–1979)

In 1975, at age sixteen, Ford was recruited by recording impresario Kim Fowley to join the all-female rock band The Runaways. The band soon secured a recording contract and released their first album in 1976. The band garnered significant media attention and the Runaways became a successful recording and touring act during their late-1970s heyday. Ford's lead-guitar playing became an integral element of the band's sound until their eventual break-up in April 1979.

In 1977, internal conflicts were erupting within the Runaways, who had by that time already parted ways with producer Fowley, lead singer Cherie Currie, and bassist Jackie Fox. Vocalist/guitarist Joan Jett wanted the band to shift to a more Ramones-influenced punk rock sound, while Ford and drummer Sandy West wanted to continue playing the hard rock-oriented songs the band had become known for. With neither faction willing to compromise, the band finally broke up in April 1979.

Solo career (1982–1995)

In 1982, Ford signed with Mercury Records and set about launching a solo career. Her debut solo album, Out for Blood, released in 1983, was a commercial disappointment. Her next release, Dancin' on the Edge (1984) achieved moderate success, and Ford's popularity began to rise. Dancin' on the Edge included the single "Fire in My Heart", which reached the Top 10 in several countries outside the United States. The follow-up single, "Gotta Let Go", performed better, reaching number one on the Mainstream Rock charts. Ford said in an interview that she recorded an unreleased album with RCA Records, and Tony Iommi did not perform on it.

Ford signed with RCA Records, hired Sharon Osbourne Management, and re-emerged with a more radio-friendly pop-metal sound. In 1988, she released her most commercially successful album, the self-produced Lita. The album featured several singles including "Kiss Me Deadly", "Back to the Cave", "Close My Eyes Forever", and "Falling in and Out of Love", a song co-written by Nikki Sixx of Mötley Crüe. The ballad "Close My Eyes Forever", a duet with Ozzy Osbourne, remains her most successful song, reaching No. 8 on the US Billboard Hot 100.
Ford followed up the success of Lita with the album Stiletto (1990). Stiletto featured the singles "Hungry" and "Lisa" (a song dedicated to her mother). However, the album failed to match the success of her previous release. Ford's next release was Dangerous Curves (1991), which featured her last charting single to date, "Shot of Poison". Ford's final album prior to a lengthy recording hiatus was Black on the German ZYX Records.

Long hiatus (1996–2007)

By the mid-1990s, Ford had turned her attention towards raising her two young sons, causing her music career to become less of a priority. Following the release of Black in 1995, Ford did not release new material until Wicked Wonderland in 2009.

Return to stage (2008–present)
In June 2008, Ford re-emerged with a new band with Stet Howland (W.A.S.P.) on drums, playing several warm-up gigs under the moniker Kiss Me Deadly prior to Rocklahoma in Pryor, Oklahoma. In June 2009, she toured the United States and Europe with a new line-up on her last fourteen shows, consisting of former Guns N' Roses guitarist Ron "Bumblefoot" Thal, drummer Dennis Leeflang, and Deepfield bassist PJ Farley.

After a long recording hiatus, Ford released Wicked Wonderland on 6 October 2009, on the JLRG Entertainment label. In an interview with ExclusiveMagazine.com, Ford spoke about her new material: "I just wanted to kick ass! I don't know what's popular, or the flavor of the day. I just wanted the music to rock! The lyrics are very personal and that's it. I wasn't going to come out in sandals with hairy armpits!"

In May 2011, Ford promised to release a "real comeback album" later in the year with drummer Chuck Spradlin, saying that 2009's nu metal-inspired Wicked Wonderland was too much of a collaborative project with ex-husband Jim Gillette. "A lot of people have told me that they want a real Lita Ford album, and I know what they mean. They are going to get it", she was quoted as saying at the time.

Living Like a Runaway was released in June 2012 on SPV/Steamhammer Records. True to her word, the album was much more in line with her earlier work. The title is also celebratory, as Ford had recently settled differences with her former Runaways' bandmates. During 2014, she was bestowed with The Certified Legend Award by Guitar Player.

In November 2014, Heaven Below guitarist Patrick Kennison joined Ford's band.

In 2016, Ford released Time Capsule, a collection of songs she discovered on old analogue tapes from the 1980s, featuring recordings she had made with Billy Sheehan, Gene Simmons, Bruce Kulick, Robin Zander, Rick Nielsen, Dave Navarro, Rodger Carter, and Jeff Scott Soto.

Personal life
In the mid-1980s, Ford was briefly engaged to guitarist Tony Iommi of Black Sabbath. Iommi co-produced her album The Bride Wore Black, which was never released. Ford said in a 1989 interview with Kerrang! that "there's a certain amount of bad blood between Tony and I".

Ford was married to W.A.S.P. guitarist Chris Holmes in the early 1990s for a short time. After the couple divorced, Ford met former Nitro vocalist Jim Gillette in 1994; the couple were married after knowing each other for only two weeks. They have two sons, James and Rocco. The family moved to Turks and Caicos, where Gillette operated a small construction and real estate development business.

The marriage to Gillette began to crumble after he entered into negotiations with TLC for a reality TV show, tentatively titled The Gillettes: An Extreme American Family. In a March 2011 interview on the Classic Rock Revisited website, Ford claimed that she had taken a business trip to Los Angeles to discuss the show with TLC executives, and returned home to find her husband and sons not speaking to her. Ford also claimed that Gillette turned the couple's children against her by insinuating that she was going to do harm to them, after she had assumed a greater level of control in the proposed series. She subsequently claimed that Gillette began encouraging her sons to physically attack her, a situation which prompted her to seek a divorce. In a February 2011 radio interview, Ford acknowledged that her marriage to Gillette was indeed over, ending any plans for a television series. Following the end of her relationship with Gillette, Ford became an advocate for the awareness of parental alienation.

In 2016, Ford published her autobiography, Living Like a Runaway: A Memoir, through Dey Street Books. In the book, Ford claimed that she left The Runaways temporarily in 1976, after coming to the conclusion that her bandmates "were all gay", a situation she didn't feel comfortable with. She wrote that she found it "strange" that they never spoke about boys with her and were "always giggling about other girls".

Acting and other projects

During her solo career, Ford endorsed musical instrument manufacturer B.C. Rich and exclusively used several of the brand's guitars, most notably the Warlock. The 1992 TV series Howie, starring Howie Mandel, saw Ford as a regular guitarist for the house band. Ford also had a small role in the 1992 horror/comedy film Highway to Hell, playing a character called "The Hitchhiker". Ford was also asked by VH-1 to join the cast of the seventh season of the reality television program The Surreal Life in 2007, to which she declined.
Ford contributed her likeness and voice to the Xbox 360, PlayStation 3, and PC video game Brütal Legend. She appears as the character Rima, alongside Jack Black, Tim Curry, Ozzy Osbourne, Rob Halford, and Lemmy Kilmister. Her song "Betrayal" is also one of the 100+ songs that appear in the game.

In 2010, a major Hollywood motion picture chronicling the career of Ford's first band, The Runaways, was produced. Ford was portrayed by actress Scout Taylor-Compton in the movie, entitled The Runaways. Ford is featured extensively in the 2005 documentary film Edgeplay: A Film About the Runaways, in which she spoke candidly about her time in the all-female band. Among other things, she alludes to verbal and sexual abuse endured by the band members at the hands of their management, specifically Kim Fowley.

In 2013, Ford reunited with former Runaways bandmate Cherie Currie to record a Christmas single. The single tied into work Currie and Ford both have done on behalf of Toys for Tots, a charity run by the US Marine Corps, which gives holiday toys to children of need.

Ford appeared on the May/June 2013 cover of Making Music Magazine to discuss her life and career.

In 2014, Ford narrated The Life, Blood, and Rhythm of Randy Castillo.

Ford competed on the reality cooking show Chopped in hopes of raising $10,000 for her charity. Ford made it through the first round, but was eliminated in the second round.

Ford released her autobiography Living Like a Runaway in June 2016.

In 2018, Ford and Jim Cara started Lita Ford Guitars, creating guitars and experiences for fans and players.

Discography

 Out for Blood (1983)
 Dancin' on the Edge (1984)
 Lita (1988)
 Stiletto (1990)
 Dangerous Curves (1991)
 Black (1995)
 Wicked Wonderland (2009)
 Living Like a Runaway (2012)

Filmography

Video game

See also
 List of British Italians
 List of glam metal bands and artists
 List of Italian-American entertainers

References

External links

"Lita Ford: Living Like A Runaway, a Memoir" autobiography book review / Rocker Magazine
Lita Ford Interview NAMM Oral History Library (2015/2017)

1958 births
Living people
American actresses
American women heavy metal singers
American women rock singers
American heavy metal guitarists
American mezzo-sopranos
American people of Italian descent
English actresses
English emigrants to the United States
English women guitarists
English heavy metal guitarists
Glam metal musicians
English mezzo-sopranos
English people of Italian descent
Italian British musicians
Lead guitarists
Mercury Records artists
Musicians from London
People with acquired American citizenship
RCA Records artists
The Runaways members
20th-century American women guitarists
20th-century American guitarists
20th-century American women singers
21st-century American women guitarists
21st-century American guitarists
21st-century American women singers
20th-century American singers
21st-century American singers
ZYX Music artists
Cleopatra Records artists
Steamhammer Records artists
Long Beach Polytechnic High School alumni